Garden City is an unincorporated community and census-designated place in Hardin County, Iowa, United States. As of the 2010 Census, the population was 89.

Demographics

History

Garden City got its start in the year 1901, following construction of the railroad through that territory.

References

Unincorporated communities in Iowa
Unincorporated communities in Hardin County, Iowa
1901 establishments in Iowa